Ludwig Holzgethan, since 1855 von Holzgethan, since 1865 Baron (Freiherr) von Holzgethan (October 1, 1800 in Vienna – June 12, 1876 in Vienna) was an Austrian statesman. He was Minister of Finance of Austria-Hungary from 1872 until his death.

External links 
 Otto 

1818 births
1876 deaths
19th-century Ministers-President of Austria
Finance ministers of Austria-Hungary
Ministers-President of Austria
19th-century Austrian people
Barons of Austria
Politicians from Vienna